Eucalyptus misella is a species of mallee that is endemic to a small area of Western Australia. It has smooth, greyish bark, narrow oblong to narrow elliptical leaves, flower buds in groups of between seven and eleven, white flowers and flattened spherical fruit.

Description
Eucalyptus misella is a mallee that typically grows to a height of  but often less, and forms a lignotuber. It has smooth, dull greyish bark and dense foliage that reaches the ground. Flowering has been recorded in November and the flowers are white.

Taxonomy
Eucalyptus misella was first formally described in 1992 by Lawrie Johnson and Ken Hill in the journal Telopea, from a specimen collected near Grasspatch in 1983. The specific epithet (misella) is from the Latin misellus meaning "wretched", referring to its low growth form.

Distribution and habitat
This mallee is common in a small area west of Grasspatch where it grows on sand-plain in heath.

Conservation status
This eucalypt has been classified as "Priority One" by the Government of Western Australia Department of Parks and Wildlife, meaning that it is known from only one or a few locations which are potentially at risk.

See also
List of Eucalyptus species

References

Eucalypts of Western Australia
misella
Myrtales of Australia
Plants described in 1992
Mallees (habit)
Taxa named by Lawrence Alexander Sidney Johnson
Taxa named by Ken Hill (botanist)